Mermiria bivittata, known generally as two-striped mermiria, is a species of slant-faced grasshopper in the family Acrididae. Other common names include the two-striped slantface grasshopper and mermiria grasshopper. It is found in Central America and North America.

Subspecies
These two subspecies belong to the species Mermiria bivittata:
 Mermiria bivittata bivittata
 Mermiria bivittata maculipennis

References

Further reading

External links

 

Gomphocerinae
Articles created by Qbugbot
Insects described in 1839